Babak Moghimi (born 1 January 1978) is an Iranian boxer. He competed at the 1996 summer Olympics and   2000 Summer Olympics in Sydney, in the welterweight.

References

1978 births
Living people
Iranian male boxers
Olympic boxers of Iran
Boxers at the 1996 Summer Olympics
Boxers at the 2000 Summer Olympics
Boxers at the 1998 Asian Games
Asian Games competitors for Iran
Welterweight boxers
20th-century Iranian people
21st-century Iranian people